Scott Stoker is an American football coach and former player. Stoker served as the head football coach at Northwestern State University in Natchitoches, Louisiana from 2002 to 2008.

Head coaching record

References

Year of birth missing (living people)
Living people
American football quarterbacks
Northwestern State Demons football players
Louisiana–Monroe Warhawks football coaches
McNeese Cowboys football coaches
Northwestern State Demons football coaches
Sam Houston Bearkats football coaches
UTEP Miners football coaches